Ahmed Lari is a member of the Kuwaiti National Assembly, representing the first district. Born in 1955, Lari studied Statistics and worked in the Municipal Council before being elected to the National Assembly in 2006.  While political parties are technically illegal in Kuwait, Lari is a member of the National Islamic Alliance, a Shia party.

Expulsion from Popular Action Bloc
On February 19, 2008, the Popular Action Bloc expelled Lari and fellow Shiite MP Adnan Zahid Abdulsamad for taking part in a ceremony eulogizing Hezbollah's slain top commander, Imad Mughniyeh.  The ceremony's description of the fugitive Lebanese militant — killed in a February 12 car bombing in Syria — as a hero sparked public outrage in a country that holds him responsible for hijacking a Kuwait Airways flight and killing two of its Kuwaiti passengers 20 years prior. The two lawmakers were only expelled from their bloc, and remained in the legislature.  After the expulsions of the two, the seven member bloc was down to five members.

Opposition to Grilling of Prime Minister Nasser
In November 2008, Waleed Al-Tabtabaie, Mohammed Al-Mutair, and Mohammed Hayef Al-Mutairi filed a request to grill Prime Minister Nasser Mohammed Al-Ahmed Al-Sabah for allowing prominent Iranian Shiite cleric Mohammad Baqir al-Fali to enter Kuwait despite a legal ban.  Lari was quoted as saying that the majority of MPs, like him, were against the grilling.

References

Members of the National Assembly (Kuwait)
Living people
Kuwaiti Shia Muslims
Kuwaiti people of Iranian descent
Popular Action Bloc politicians
National Islamic Alliance politicians
Year of birth missing (living people)